The Washington–Chicago Express, an American named passenger train of the Baltimore and Ohio Railroad (B&O), was one of four daily B&O trains operating between Washington, D.C., and  Chicago, Illinois, via Pittsburgh, Pennsylvania during the 1930s–1960s. Other B&O trains of that period on the route were the Capitol Limited,  Columbian, and the Shenandoah.

Operating westbound as Train # 9, the Chicago Express, and eastbound as Train # 10, the Washington Express, it was an "accommodation" train, meaning that it made stops at most stations along the route bypassed by B&O's other trains, resulting in a slower timecard than the more prestigious Capitol Limited. The Washington–Chicago Express required a leisurely 18½ hours for its  journey, compared to the faster Capitol Limiteds 16-hour pace. The Washington–Chicago Express was also B&O's primary train for mail and Railway Express Agency shipments, having heavy head end equipment consisting of several Railway Post Office (RPO) cars, baggage cars, and bulk mail boxcars. The Washington–Chicago Express continued to offer Pullman sleeping car and dining car service into the mid-1960s.

Latter years 
The ending of B&O's mail contract in the late-1960s by the U.S. Postal Service spelled the doom of the train, resulting in the discontinuation of its westbound train in 1967 before the advent of Amtrak in 1971. Between 1965 and 1967 the train's sleeping cars were shortened from Washington – Chicago to Pittsburgh – Chicago. Between 1967 and 1968 the train lost its sleeping cars and its dining car. The eastbound train Washington Express continued into 1968. The train was terminated by 1969, leaving the Capitol Limited as the B&O's only eastbound Chicago-Washington train. The Gateway, an eastbound-only Chicago-Pittsburgh train, briefly continued the #10 designation. The train operated as a daytime coach, with a food bar.

Stations

Schedule and equipment 

In addition to a Washington–Chicago through sleeping car and dining car providing full meal service en route, the B&O's Washington–Chicago Express also offered a "set-out" sleeper in Pittsburgh, Pennsylvania. In 1961, for example, the set-out sleeper for Washington was parked on a siding at Pittsburgh's Pittsburgh & Lake Erie Railroad Station (used by B&O's long-distance trains) and available for occupancy by passengers at 9:00 p.m., prior to the arrival of the eastbound Washington Express at  10:30 p.m. The sleeper was then coupled to the rear of the train during the 25-minute layover there.
 
In 1961, the westbound Chicago Express Train # 9 operated on the following schedule (departure times at principal stops shown in blue, connecting Budd Rail Diesel Car from Baltimore, Maryland, in yellow):

References 

Named passenger trains of the United States
Passenger trains of the Baltimore and Ohio Railroad
Transportation in Chicago
Transportation in Baltimore
Transportation in Pittsburgh
Passenger rail transportation in Illinois
Passenger rail transportation in Indiana
Passenger rail transportation in Maryland
Passenger rail transportation in Ohio
Passenger rail transportation in Pennsylvania
Passenger rail transportation in Washington, D.C.
Passenger rail transportation in West Virginia
Night trains of the United States
Railway services discontinued in 1967